Jack Ipalibo (born 6 April 1998) is a Nigerian professional footballer who plays for Norwegian club Strømsgodset, as a midfielder.

Club Career

Early years
Jack Ipalibo started his football career at Diamond Football Academy in Nigeria in 2016.

Villareal C
On 11 September 2016, he transferred to the academy of Spanish club Villarreal C.

Villareal B
Ipalibo showed an outstanding performance in a short time and was promoted to the Villarreal B team.He started training with the first team from time to time with Villarreal.

Strømsgodset (loan) 
On 3 August 2019, Jack signed for Strømsgodset on a year-long loan deal from Villarreal B. In his first season with Strømsgodset, he failed to contribute any goals in 15 games.
On 1 July 2020, he received a red card in the match played against Stabæk Fotball in the 5th week of the season at Eliteserien, which was the first red card of his career.

Strømsgodset
30th of June 2020 he signed permanently for Strømsgodset, on a three-year-long deal. In the 2020-21 season, he scored his first goal against Viking FK in 22 matches with Strømsgodset, scoring a total of 3 goals in Odds BK and Sarpsborg 08 matches.Jack scored his first goal in Eliteserien with Strømsgodset in the 2022-23 season, in the 37th minute of their 3-0 win against Rosenborg on 8 May 2022.Jack Ipalıbo scored 3 more goals for the rest of the season and finished Eliteserien with 4 goals in 2021-22.

Style of play
Jack has been compared to the famous Ivorian football player Yaya Toure with her playing style and talent.

Career statistics

Club

References

External links

Footballdatabase Profile

1998 births
Living people
Nigerian footballers
Nigerian expatriate footballers
Nigerian expatriate sportspeople in Norway
Expatriate footballers in Norway
Strømsgodset Toppfotball players
Eliteserien players
Association football midfielders